Edward Stanley  (by 1513 – 1564 or later), of Harlech, Merionethshire, was a Welsh politician and member of the Parliament of England.

Family and education
Stanley was the second son of Peter Stanley of Flint, Flintshire and his wife, Janet née Butler, a daughter of Sir Thomas Butler. He was educated at Oxford University, achieving a Bachelor of Arts on 2 July 1526. Stanley married Ellen, an illegitimate daughter of Meredydd ap Ievan ap Robert of Dolwyddelan and Gwydir, Caernarvonshire. Stanley was the brother-in-law of John Wynn ap Meredydd, MP for Caernarvonshire.

Career
He was a Member (MP) of the Parliament of England for Merioneth in 1542. He was Sheriff of Merionethshire in 1544–45, 1552–53 and 1559–60.

References

Year of death missing
16th-century Welsh politicians
People from Merionethshire
English MPs 1542–1544
Year of birth uncertain
Sheriffs in the United Kingdom